Wadebridge West was an electoral division of Cornwall in the United Kingdom which returned one member to sit on Cornwall Council from 2009 to 2021. It was abolished at the 2021 local elections, being succeeded by Wadebridge West and St Mabyn.

Councillors

Extent
Wadebridge West represented the west of the town of Wadebridge. The division was nominally abolished during boundary changes at the 2013 election, but this had little effect on the ward. From 2009 to 2013, the division covered 210 hectares in total; after the boundary changes in 2013, it covered 209 hectares.

Election results

2019 by-election

2017 election

2016 by-election

2013 election

2009 election

References

Wadebridge
Electoral divisions of Cornwall Council